Do-ol is the pen name of the contemporary South Korean philosopher Kim Yong-ok (sometimes given as To-ol Kim Young-oak).

Career and education
Dr. Kim Yong-ok (literally "Gold Dragon Jade"), best known by his pen-name “Do-ol” (stone-head, a 
Daoist/Zen reference) is Korea's leading "public philosopher." He was born June 14, 1948 in Cheonan.

Once a leading professor of the Oriental Classics at Korea University, Kim became a Doctor of Oriental Medicine, a playwright and movie-director, and is now professor emeritus of Chung-ang University. He is an expert on Oriental doctrines and medicines, and a polyglot. He has been putting out several successful series of books and lectures on KBS TV covering his relevant modern interpretations of classical Daoism (Lao-tzu), the Analects of Confucius and Zen Buddhism (the Diamond Sutra).

Kim graduated from Korea University with a bachelor's degree in philosophy. He received master's degrees at both the National Taiwan University and the University of Tokyo. He received his Ph.D. from Harvard University, his paper being about Wang Fuzhi. He also received a Doctor of Oriental Medicine from Wonkwang University.

Philosophy
Kim's theory of philosophy, however, is not fully accepted by either Korean or Western philosophical circles. The philosophy of Ki (Qi, in Chinese) claims the unique revival and reinterpretation of Eastern traditional philosophy to overcome the intrinsic limitations of Western philosophical traditions. Throughout his books, Kim claims that his unique formulation of the philosophy of Ki is revolutionary in mankind's intellectual history. He has published this idea quite often throughout his numerous works, but the philosophy itself seems to undergo the process of development.

Lawsuit
In June 2019, Kim was sued for defamation by the family of former president Syngman Rhee for his speeches in his talk show Do-ol Ah-in Going All Directions, where he allegedly called Rhee a puppet of the United States and the Soviet Union who was responsible for the Division of Korea and the mass murder of Jeju people in Jeju Uprising incident.

Personal life
Kim has one daughter, Miru Kim, who works as an artist, photographer, and arts events coordinator.

Filmography

TV lecture show

TV documentary

Film

See also
 Miru Kim

Notes

Bibliography
 Hyegang Choe Han-gi wa Yugyo / Tool Kim Yong-ok. Soul-si : Tongnamu, 2004. (Series: Kim, Yong-ok, Selections. 2003 ; 3.) LCCN B5254.C54K538
 동양학 어떻게 할 것인가 / minumsa, 1985.
 여자란 무엇인가 / Tongnamu, 1986.
 중고생을 위한 철학강의 / Tongnamu,
 절차탁마 대기만성 / Tongnamu,
 독기학설 / Tongnamu,
 백두산 신곡, 기철학 강론 / Tongnamu,
 기철학 산조 / Tongnamu,
 노자철학 이것이다 / Tongnamu,
 신한국기 / Tongnamu,
 대화 / Tongnamu,
 석도화론 / Tongnamu,
 건강하세요 / Tongnamu,
 너와 나의 한의학 / Tongnamu,
 기옹은 이렇게 말했다 / Tongnamu,
 태권도 철학의 구성원리 / Tongnamu,
 새춘향뎐 / Tongnamu,
 시나리오 장군의 아들 / Tongnamu,
 천명 개벽 / Tongnamu,
 화두 혜능과 세익스피어 / Tongnamu,
 도올세설 / Tongnamu, 
 금강경강해 / Tongnamu, 1999
 노자와 21세기 1,2,3 / Tongnamu, 1999
 도올 논어 1,2,3 / Tongnamu,2001
 요한복음 강해 / Tongnamu, 2007
 기독교 성서의 이해 / Tongnamu, 2007
 큐복음서 / Tongnamu, 2009
 계림수필 / Tongnamu, 2010
 논어 역주 / Tongnamu, 2009
 효경 역주 / Tongnamu, 2009
 맹자-사람의 길 1,2-상,하 / Tongnamu, 2012
 대학, 학기 역주 / Tongnamu, 2010
 중용역주 / Tongnamu, 2011
 중용 인간의 맛 / Tongnamu, 2011
 사랑하지 말자 / Tongnamu, 2012
 도올의 아침놀 / Tongnamu, 2012
 도올의 교육 입국론 / Tongnamu, 2015
 도올, 시진핑을 말하다 / Tongnamu, 2016
 박원순과 도올 국가를 말하다 / Tongnamu, 2016
 도올의 로마서 강해-A Commentary on the Epistle of Paul to the Romans / Tongnamu, 2017
 etc.

1948 births
Living people
Harvard University alumni
Korea University alumni
National Taiwan University alumni
People from Cheonan
South Korean expatriates in Japan
South Korean expatriates in Taiwan
South Korean expatriates in the United States
South Korean philosophers
University of Tokyo alumni
21st-century philosophers
Gwangsan Kim clan